Manduca caribbeus is a moth of the  family Sphingidae. It is known from Haiti and the Dominican Republic.

The wingspan is 80–85 mm. Adults have been recorded from May to June.

References

Manduca
Moths described in 1952